Lea is a feminine given name. In French the name Léa is from the biblical name Leah. In Spanish the same name is Lía, and in Italian Lia. In English it is an alternative spelling of Lee, meaning pasture or meadow.

Notable people with the given name Lea include:

People
Saint Lea, third century Catholic saint
Lea (musician), or Lea-Marie Becker (born 1992), professionally known as Lea (stylized as LEA), German singer-songwriter and keyboardist
Lea Antonoplis (born 1959), American tennis player
Lea Bošković (born 1999), Croatian tennis player
Lea DeLaria (born 1958), American comedian, actress and jazz musician
Lea Gottlieb (1918–2012), Hungarian-born Israeli fashion designer
Lea Hernandez (born 1964), American comic book and webcomic artist
Lea Horowitz (1933–1956), Israeli Olympic hurdler
Lea Massari (born 1933), Italian actress
Lea Maurer (born 1971), American swimmer and coach
Lea Michele (born 1986), American actress and singer
Lea Niako (1908–?), German dancer and actress
Helena "Lea" Nordheim (1903–1943), Dutch Olympic champion gymnast
Lea Padovani (1920–1991), Italian actress
Lea Pericoli (born 1935), Italian tennis player
Lea Piltti (1904–1982), Finnish opera singer
Lea Salonga (born 1971), Filipina singer, actress, and columnist
Lea Sölkner (born 1958), Austrian retired alpine skier
Lea Stevens (born 1947), Australian politician
Lea Thompson (born 1961), American actress

Fictional characters 
Lea, the main protagonist of the video game CrossCode
 Lea, the original human form of Axel from the Kingdom Hearts video game series
Lea Dilallo, the wife of Dr Shaun Murphy from The Good Doctor

See also
LEA (disambiguation), also covers Lea
LEAS (disambiguation)
Leah (given name)
Lia

Feminine given names